The 68th running of the Tour of Flanders cycling classic was held on Sunday, 1 April 1984. Dutch rider Johan Lammerts won the monument race in his first attempt, following a late escape from a six-man group. Ireland's Sean Kelly won the sprint for second place at 25 seconds. 40 of 181 riders finished.

Route
The race started in Sint Niklaas and finished in Meerbeke (Ninove) – covering 268 km. There were 12 categorized climbs:

Results

References

External links
 Video of the 1984 Tour of Flanders  on Sporza (in Dutch)

Tour of Flanders
1984 in road cycling
1984 in Belgian sport
1984 Super Prestige Pernod International